Trans Europe Halles (TEH) is a European-based network of cultural centres initiated by citizens and artists.

History 
In 1983 the independent cultural centre "Les Halles de Schaerbeek" (Brussels, Belgium) organised a weekend of discussions in Brussels to enable European independent cultural centres to exchange experiences and participate in events under the theme of  "Adventures of the rediscovered ark". This three-day forum focused on an alternative culture emerging in rehabilitated industrial buildings, and asserting its identity despite the reservations of political authorities. 

The seven independent cultural centers that participated in this 1983 meeting and co-founded Trans Europe Halles (TEH) are: Halles de Schaerbeek in Brussels, Huset KBH in Copenhagen, Kulturfabrik in Koblenz, Melkweg in Amsterdam, Ny Scen in Gothenburg, Usine de Pali-Kao in Paris and the Rote Fabrik in Zurich. The list of members has since gradually expanded to include other multidisciplinary venues (film, video, theater, visual arts, music), such as Le Confort Moderne or Le Plus Petit Cirque du Monde in France. They put forward often upcoming artists, as well as stars and cult films. They organize music festivals or rave parties, urban art workshops, exchanges and gatherings on social themes, etc.

That 1983 meeting was the seed of what nowadays is Trans Europe Halles (TEH), the European-based network of cultural centres initiated by citizens and artists, that currently gathers together around eighty members and associated organisations in almost thirty countries.

TEH members are cultural centres emerged from civil society initiatives that have a multidisciplinary artistic policy encouraging interaction between art forms, with an emphasis on contemporary art. One of the common and most defining characteristics of these centres is that they are based on industrial or commercial buildings that have been adapted to artistic and cultural uses. Besides this, they are very diverse in terms of geographical location, size, inspirational backgrounds, funding models, artistic programmes, etc.

Organization & Structure

Members 
Trans Europe Halles has currently 89 members and 51 associate organisations in 40 countries. Most of Trans Europe Halles centres are established in repurposed buildings: industrial heritage buildings like factories, warehouses, or more recently buildings formerly dedicated to military, commercial or religious uses.
All Trans Europe Halles centres are multidisciplinary, but their main artistic disciplines as well as their regular activities vary a lot.
To become a TEH Member, applicant cultural centres must fulfill the following membership criteria:

To be an independent and not-for-profit centre arising from a citizen’s initiative with a legal structure.
To have a multidisciplinary artistic policy encouraging interaction between art forms, with an emphasis on contemporary art. 
To be based in user-friendly buildings preferably originating from a commercial or industrial heritage. 
To have a high-quality artistic programme of at least regional significance with an awareness of contemporary culture, ranging from local to international art. 
To be aware of the social and political aspects of cultural actions with an Equal Opportunities Policy or commitment.

Governance and Management 
TEH is run in a decentralised way; the member centres participate in the decision-making of the network during the network meetings. Each centre has one vote regardless of its size or economic status. The Executive Committee, selected biannually, is the governing and policy making body of the network.

The members of Trans Europe Halles meet twice a year during TEH Meetings. Decisions are made at the General Assembly of each meeting. During the Spring meeting a formal General Assembly is held with the approval of final accounts, election of Executive Committee and approval of the yearly budget. Each member has one vote regardless of the size of the centre.

Trans Europe Halles’ Executive Committee is the governing and policy making body of the network. It consists of a minimum of five and a maximum of eight people and is elected for two years at a time.

The Trans Europe Halles Coordination Office is located at the cultural centre Mejeriet in Lund, Sweden. With a broad and multi-lingual membership and an intense flow of information and ideas, the Trans Europe Halles Coordination Office is a crucial hub. The Coordination Office is responsible for internal and external communication of the network and publishes the monthly TEH Newsletter. The Coordination Office also supports project-planning and fundraising activities for the network and has become a focal point of expertise within the network.

Activities

Meetings 
Organised twice a year and hosted by a different member centre each time, the TEH meetings are a source of inspiration and a birthplace for new collaborations. It is also the opportunity for our members to meet and discover new countries and new cultural centres.

The activities and programme are all of interest of the participants, with a strong focus on capacity building. During three days, participants are invited to take part to workshops, seminars, lectures, and networking sessions. On the last day of each meeting, an outing is organised for the participants to get to know more about the local culture.

Projects 
The network coordinates several bilateral and multilateral projects:

 2015–2019 Creative Lenses: Business Models For Culture
 2015–2017 Europe Grand Central
 2014–2015 Independent Cultural Centres In South America
 2015-2019 Engine Room Europe (ERE)
 2013–2015 Green Art Lab Alliance (GALA)
 2013–2014 TEH Mentorship Programme
 2011–2014 Engine Room Europe
 2010 Conference New Times New Models

Publications and Resources 

 Design Handbook for Cultural Centres, 2014.
 CSOS Creative Strategies of Sustainability for Cultural Operators, 2014.
 Leaders Stories, 2014.
 New Times, New Models. Investigating the internal governance models and external relations of independent cultural centres in times of change, 2010.
 Changing Room. Mobility of Non-Artistic Cultural Professionals in Europe, 2010.
 The Lift. Sharing experiences of a youth exchange network project, 2009.
 Managing Independent Cultural Centres. A Reference Manual, 2008.
 Factories of Imagination, 2001.

Trans Europe Halles also publishes reports, handbooks and other types of media on subjects concerning culture in Europe.

References

External links 
Trans Europe Halles' website 

Industrial archaeology
International cultural organizations
European cultural exchange
Community centres
Cultural centers
Squatters' movements
Non-profit organizations based in Sweden
Organizations established in 1983